Mable Fergerson (born January 18, 1955 in Los Angeles, California) is an American athlete who mainly competed in the 400 metres.  She made the Olympic team just weeks after graduating from Ganesha High School in Pomona, California.  At the time before Title IX, high schools had no athletic programs for girls.  Her 51.91 from the semi-final of the Olympics was the fastest on record for a high school girl to that point in time.

She competed for the United States at the 1972 Summer Olympics held in Munich, Germany she won the silver medal in the 4 x 400 metres where with her teammates Madeline Manning, Cheryl Toussaint and Kathy Hammond.  That year she also finished fifth in the 400 metres.

References

External links
 Official profile

1955 births
American female sprinters
Olympic silver medalists for the United States in track and field
Athletes (track and field) at the 1972 Summer Olympics
Track and field athletes from Los Angeles
Living people
Medalists at the 1972 Summer Olympics
Olympic female sprinters
21st-century American women